The Invisible Woman is a 1969 Italian drama film written and directed  by Paolo Spinola and starring Giovanna Ralli and Carla Gravina.

Plot
Laura realizes that her husband Andrea no longer loves her, so much so that he can see through her body, almost not even existing. Deeply in love with him - whose attentions all seem to be directed to Delfina, another woman who lives at home with them - Laura pines, tries to rekindle her interest, confessing to him an occasional betrayal, but all is useless. One day, during a hunting trip, Andrea, shooting a pheasant, kills her with one of the shots, but this time he doesn't even notice her, lying next to the prey and moves away from Delfina's arm. Addressing her, however, he calls her Laura.

Cast 

Giovanna Ralli as Laura
Carla Gravina as  Delfina
Anita Sanders as  Anita
Silvano Tranquilli as  Andrea
 Gigi Rizzi as Carlo
 Elena Persiani as Tania
 Gino Cassani as Tania's Husband
 Franca Sciutto as  Crocetta
 Raúl Ramírez as  Osvaldo

See also
 List of Italian films of 1969

References

External links

 

Italian drama films
1969 drama films
1969 films
Films scored by Ennio Morricone
1960s Italian-language films
1960s Italian films